The Flårjuvnutane Peaks are a group of small rock peaks about  west of Flårjuven Bluff, on the Ahlmann Ridge in Queen Maud Land, Antarctica. They were mapped by Norwegian cartographers from surveys and air photos by the Norwegian–British–Swedish Antarctic Expedition (1949–52) and named Flårjuvnutane.

References 

Mountains of Queen Maud Land
Princess Martha Coast